Joan Konner (born Joan Barbara Weiner; February 24, 1931 – April 18, 2018), was an American academic and journalist who served as Dean of the Columbia School of Journalism.

Born in Paterson, New Jersey, Konner received her B.A. from Sarah Lawrence College and an M.S. from Columbia University before becoming a journalist with the Bergen Record. She produced over 50 documentaries and television series, including the PBS series The Power of Myth, and She Says/Women in News, which won a 2002 Emmy Award. In September 1988, she became the first female Dean of the Columbia School of Journalism, a position she held for eight years. From 1988-99 she was the publisher of the Columbia Journalism Review.

Death
Joan Konner died on April 18, 2018 in Manhattan of leukemia, aged 87.

References

External links

1931 births
2018 deaths
Columbia University alumni
Columbia University Graduate School of Journalism faculty
People from Paterson, New Jersey
Sarah Lawrence College alumni
Emmy Award winners
Deaths from leukemia
Deaths from cancer in New York (state)